Casco Township is the name of some places in the U.S. state of Michigan:

 Casco Township, Allegan County, Michigan
 Casco Township, St. Clair County, Michigan

Michigan township disambiguation pages